Choiseul was a single-member constituency of the Governing Council and Legislative Assembly of the Solomon Islands. Created in 1973 when the Governing Council was expanded from 17 to 24 seats, it covered Choiseul Island, replacing the former Choiseul/Shortlands constituency.

In the 1973 elections the seat was won by Gideon Zoleveke. It was abolished in 1976 and succeeded by North Choiseul (in which Zoleveke was re-elected) and South Choiseul.

List of MPs

Election results

1973

References

Governing Council of the Solomon Islands constituencies
Legislative Assembly of the Solomon Islands constituencies
1973 establishments in the Solomon Islands
Constituencies established in 1973
1976 disestablishments in the Solomon Islands
Constituencies disestablished in 1976